The 1931 season was the second completed season of Finnish Football League Championship, known as the Mestaruussarja. HIFK Helsinki is the defending champion.

Overview

The 1931 Mestaruussarja  was contested by 8 teams, with HIFK Helsinki winning the championship which was also known as the A-sarja [‘A-Series’]. HJK Helsinki and ViPS Viipuri were relegated to the second tier which was known as the B-sarja [‘B-Series’].

Participating clubs 

In 1930, there were 8 participants in the Mestaruussarja:

 HIFK Helsinki
 HJK Helsinki - Promoted from B-sarja
 HPS Helsinki 
 KIF Helsinki 
 Sudet Viipuri - Promoted from B-sarja
 TPS Turku 
 ViPS Viipuri 
 VPS Vaasa

League table

Results

References

Mestaruussarja seasons
Fin
Fin
1931 in Finnish football